|}

The Beverley Bullet Sprint Stakes is a Listed flat horse race in Great Britain open to horses aged three years or older. It is run at Beverley over a distance of 5 furlongs (1,006 metres).
The race was first run in 2004 and it is scheduled to take place each year in late August or early September.

Records

Most successful horse (2 wins):
Chookie Heiton (2004, 2005)
Take Cover (2017, 2018)
  Tis Marvellous (2021, 2022) 

Leading jockey (3 wins):
Tom Eaves – Chookie Heiton (2004, 2005), Tangerine Trees (2011)

Leading trainer (3 wins):
Bryan Smart  – Hellvelyn (2007), Tangerine Trees (2011), Alpha Delphini (2016)

Winners

See also
 Horse racing in Great Britain
 List of British flat horse races

References
 Racing Post:

Flat races in Great Britain
Beverley Racecourse
Open sprint category horse races
Recurring sporting events established in 2004
2004 establishments in England